Thaliritta Kinakkal is a 1980 Indian Malayalam film,  directed by P. Gopikumar. The film stars Prathap Pothen, Sukumaran, Kuthiravattam Pappu and Madhumalini in the lead roles. The film has musical score by Jithin Shyam.

The film is famous for being the only Malayalam film to have featured the legendary Mohammed Rafi in its soundtrack. Being huge fans of his, the makers were keen on getting Indian cinema's favourite voice to record for them. However, Rafi commented that he needed a few weeks to learn the pronunciation of the language and without understanding the language he would not be able to impart the right emotions. Rafi had died before the recording could materialise. Hence, a Hindi song was decided to be included in the film, to which he agreed, and thus "Shabab Leke" came about.

Cast
Prathap Pothen
Sukumaran
Kuthiravattam Pappu
Madhu Malini
Tanuja
Kovai Sarala

Soundtrack
The music was composed by Jithin Shyam and the lyrics were written by Jamal Kochangadi, Aayish Kamal and P. Bhaskaran.

References

External links
 

1980 films
1980s Malayalam-language films
Films directed by P. Gopikumar